Pricing objectives or goals give direction to the whole pricing process. Determining what your objectives are is the first step in pricing. When deciding on pricing objectives you must consider: 1) the overall financial, marketing,  and strategic objectives of the company; 2) the objectives of your product or brand; 3) consumer price elasticity and price points; and 4) the resources you have available.

Some of the more common pricing objectives are:
 maximize long-run profit
 maximize short-run profit
 increase sales volume (quantity)
 increase monetary sales 
 increase market share
 obtain a target rate of return on investment (ROI)
 obtain a target rate of return on sales
 stabilize market or stabilize market price: an objective to stabilize price means that the marketing manager attempts to keep prices stable in the marketplace and to compete on non-price considerations. Stabilization of margin is basically a cost-plus approach in which the manager attempts to maintain the same margin regardless of changes in cost. 
 company growth
 maintain price leadership
 desensitize customers to price
 discourage new entrants into the industry
 match competitors prices
 encourage the exit of marginal firms from the industry
 survival
 avoid government investigation or intervention
 obtain or maintain the loyalty and enthusiasm of distributors and other sales personnel
 enhance the image of the firm, brand, or product
 be perceived as “fair” by customers and potential customers
 create interest and excitement about a product
 discourage competitors from cutting prices
 use price to make the product “visible"
 help prepare for the sale of the business (harvesting)
 social, ethical, or ideological objectives

See also
 Price
 Price controls
 Price fixing
 Price gouging
 Just price
 Resale price maintenance
 Pricing
 Pricing strategies

Pricing